The General de la Rey Regiment (formerly Regiment de la Rey) is an reserve infantry regiment of the South African Army.

Formation
The Regiment de la Rey was established in 1934 as one of the new Afrikaans language Citizen Force units of the Union Defence Force.

The regimental badge depicts a lion's head, in memory of Boer General JH de la Rey, the Lion of the West after whom the regiment is named.

Before the Second World War, battalion headquarters were at Rustenburg in the Transvaal. The unit had company headquarters at Potchefstroom, Klerksdorp and Ventersdorp, with a support company at Brits.

Mrs J E Morkel, daughter of General De la Rey, became the first honorary colonel of the regiment.

The regiment was affiliated to the Northamptonshire Regiment of the British Army.

World War II
RDLR was called up for full-time service on 18 July 1940. Because the commanding officer, Lt-Col (later Brig) H P van Noorden, was by then commanding a battalion of the Field Force Brigade, command of the regiment passed to Lt-Col WD Basson.

The regiment was amalgamated with the Witwatersrand Rifles Regiment. After training in Egypt, the new unit, Wits-delaRey (WR/DLR) made a name for itself as one of the motorised infantry battalions of the 12th Motorised Brigade in the 6th South African Armoured Division in Italy in 1944–45.

For almost the entire Italian campaign RDLR was commanded by Lt-Col Jack Bester, until he was appointed to command the newly formed 13th Motorised Brigade.

The regiment distinguished itself particularly in taking Allerona on 15 June 1944, in fighting on Monte Querciabella and Monte Fili, and in forcing the River Greve in July 1944.

WR/DLR were the first on Monte Stanco in the Apennines in October 1944 and scored a spectacular success in the final offensive in Italy when they took Monte Caprara on 16 April 1945.

The unit's casualties were among the heaviest in the division. During the Italian campaign 119 soldiers were killed, 576 wounded and 17 were posted missing in action.

On 1 January 1960 the regiment was renamed Regiment Wes-Transvaal with headquarters at Potchefstroom. After objections and strenuous efforts it resumed its original designation as Regiment De la Rey on 1 September 1966.

The Border War
The regiment participated in the South African Border War, also known as the Namibian War of Independence, the conflict that took place from 1966 to 1989 in South-West Africa (now Namibia) and Angola between South Africa and its allied forces (mainly UNITA) and the Angolan government, South-West Africa People's Organisation (SWAPO), and their allies the Soviet Union and Cuba.

Operation Packer

Operation Hooper, in which the main participants were Permanent Force and National Service members, officially ended on 13 March 1988. A Citizen Force call up provided fresh troops into the SADF-UNITA force which had been tasked to drive People's Armed Forces for the Liberation of Angola (FAPLA) forces from Cuito Cuanavale. This injection of fresh troops allowed Operation Hooper to move seamlessly into Operation Packer. The objective of the operation was to drive the combined FAPLA/Cuban force back across the Cuito River to the west bank.

The primary assault force which was to 'drive the enemy' out of Tumpo consisted of 13 Olifant tanks with crews from Regiment President Steyn, a squadron of Ratel 90's from Regiment Mooirivier (RMR), a mechanised infantry battalion from Regiment de la Rey and from Regiment Groot Karoo, three companies from 32 Battalion, three UNITA regular battalions and two semi-regular UNITA battalions plus a number of other components.

Post-1994
The regiment is one of only six mechanised units in the SANDF Reserve Force.

1 RDLR took part in the 50th anniversary parade of Regiment Mooirivier in Potchefstroom on 23 July 2004.

External deployment
2 South African Infantry Battalion, situated in Zeerust, deployed to the Democratic Republic of the Congo (DRC) from October 2005 to May 2006. A full company of 1 Regiment De La Rey (1RDLR) deployed with them. one mortar platoon 1RDLR – under Lt Col B. Schoeman.

Name Change
In August 2019, 52 Reserve Force units had their names changed to reflect the diverse military history of South Africa. Regiment de la Rey became the General de la Rey Regiment, and have 3 years to design and implement new regimental insignia.

Battle honours

Italy 1944–45, Cassino II, Allerona, Florence, Monte Querciabella, Monte Fili, The Greve, Gothic Line, Monte Stanco, Monte Salvaro, Sole/Caprara, Po Valley, Campo Santo Bridge

Leadership

1st Battalion

2nd Battalion

Insignia

Previous Dress Insignia

Current Dress Insignia

Notes

References

Infantry regiments of South Africa
Military units and formations in Potchefstroom
Military units and formations of South Africa in World War II
Military units and formations of South Africa in the Border War
Military units and formations established in 1934
South African Army